This is a list of viaducts and significant bridges of Thailand's railways, past and present.

0–9
 100-metres Bridge, Prachuap Khiri Khan Province

A

B
 Ban Mai Bridge, Nakhon Sawan Province
 Ban Phai Elevated Railway, Khon Kaen Province
 Bangkok Elevated Road and Train System viaduct (incompleted), Bangkok and Pathum Thani Province
 Bang Mun Nak Bridge, Phichit Province
 Bang Pakong River Railway bridge, Chachoengsao Province
 Bang Saphan River Railway bridge, Prachuap Khiri Khan Province
 Bridge near Prachantakham railway station, Prachinburi Province
 Bueng Boraphet Railway bridge, Nakhon Sawan Province
 BTS Skytrain viaduct, Bangkok

C
 Chakri Railway bridge, crossing Pa Sak River, Phra Nakhon Si Ayutthaya Province
 Chawang River Railway bridge, Nakhon Si Thammarat Province
 Chi River Railway bridge, Khon Kaen Province
 Chulachomklao bridge, or Ban Don Bridge, Tha Kham Bridge, Surat Thani Bridge, Surat Thani Province
 Chulalongkorn Railway bridge, crossing Mae Klong River, Ratchaburi Province
 Composite Bridge, using instead of Pang La Bridge, Lampang Province

D
 Dong Ta Khob Bridge, Phichit Province

E

F

G
 Guang River Railway bridge, Lamphun Province

H
 Hanuman River Railway bridge, Prachinburi Province
 Hua Dong Bridge, Phichit Province
 Hua Hin Elevated Railway, Prachuap Khiri Khan Province (Under Construction)
 Huai Chorakhemak Railway bridge, Buriram Province
 Huai Kha Yung Railway bridge, Si Sa Ket Province
 Huai Mae Ta Bridge, crossing Yom River, Phrae Province
 Huai Samran Railway bridge, Si Sa Ket Province
 Huai Thap Than Railway bridge, Surin Province

I

J

K
 Khlong Bangkok Noi Railway bridge, Bangkok
 Khlong Bang Khen Railway bridge, Bangkok
 Khlong Bang Prong Bridge, Nakhon Sawan Province
 Khlong Bang Ra Mat Bridge, Bangkok
 Khlong Bang Sue Railway bridge, Bangkok
 Khlong Chan Dee Bridge, Nakhon Si Thammarat Province
 Khlong Cholaprathan Anusatsananun Bridge, Nakhon Sawan Province
 Khlong Chorakhephuek Bridge, Nakhon Sawan Province
 Khlong Ka Mang Railway bridge, Phra Nakhon Si Ayutthaya Province
 Khlong Luek Bridge, near the Cambodia border, Sa Kaeo Province
 Khlong Pla Kot Bridge, Nakhon Sawan Province
 Khlong Rang Sit Railway bridge, Pathum Thani Province
 Khlong Sam Sen Railway bridge, Bangkok
 Khlong Tha Lo Bridge, Phichit Province
 Khlong Tha Luang Bridge, Phichit Province
 Khlong Yan Railway bridge, Surat Thani Province
 Khok Khlee Bridge, Lopburi Province
 Khon Kaen Elevated Railway, Khon Kaen Province
 Kwae Noi Railway bridge, Phitsanulok Province
 Kui Buri River Railway bridge, Prachuap Khiri Khan Province

L
 Lam Chakkarat Railway bridge, Nakhon Ratchasima Province
 Lam Chi Railway bridge, Surin Province
 Lam Plai Mat Railway bridge, Buriram Province
 Lang Suan River Railway bridge, Chumphon Province
 Lopburi Bypass Elevated Railway, Lopburi Province (Under Construction)

M
 Mae Thiap Bridge, Phitsanulok Province
 Maha Nak Railway bridge, Bangkok
 Huai Muak Lek Bridge, Saraburi Province
 Muak Lek Elevated Railway, Saraburi Province (Under Construction)

N
 Nong Pling Bridge, Nakhon Sawan Province

O

P
 Pak Pan Bridge, Phrae Province
 Pang La Bridge or Ha Ho Bridge, Lampang Province
 Pattani River Railway bridge, Yala Province
 Pa Sak Cholasit Dam Bridges, consist of 5 bridge spans, Saraburi and Lopburi Province
 Pa Sak River Railway bridge, Saraburi Province
 Pa Sak River Railway bridge, Lopburi Province
 Phra Prong Bridge, Prachinburi Province
 Phetchaburi River Railway bridge, Phetchaburi Province
 Phong River Railway bridge, Khon Kaen Province
 Poramin Bridge, or Ban Dara Bridge, Uttaradit Province
 Prachantakham River Bridge, Prachinburi Province
 Pranburi River Railway bridge, Prachuap Khiri Khan Province

Q

R
 Railway bridges near Bang Krathum railway station, Phitsanulok Province
 Rama VI Bridge, crossing Chao Phraya River, Bangkok, one of the longest truss bridge in Thailand.
 Rama I Canal Bridge, Songkhla Province

S
 Saowabha Bridge, crossing Tha Chin River, Nakhon Pathom Province
 Sai Buri River Railway bridge, Yala Province
 Sam Ho Bridge, Lampang Province
 Song Ho Bridge, Lampang Province
 Suvarnabhumi Airport Link viaduct, Bangkok and Samut Prakan Province

T
 Thai–Lao Friendship Bridge, Nong Khai Province
 Tham Krasae Bridge, Kanchanaburi Province
 Tha Chang Bridge, crossing Mun River, Nakhon Ratchasima Province
 Tha Chom Phu Bridge, or White Bridge, Lamphun Province
 Tha Taphao River Railway bridge, Chumphon Province
 Thepha River Railway bridge, Songkhla Province
 The Bridge on the River Kwai, Kanchanaburi Province

V

W
 Wang River Railway bridge, Lampang Province
 Watabaek Bridge, crossing Suranarai Road, Chaiyaphum Province

X

Y
 Yothaka Bridge, crossing Nakhon Nayok River, Chachoengsao Province

Z

See also
List of railway tunnels in Thailand
List of bridges in Thailand

External links

 Thai Railway bridges